Carl Marvin "Dutch" Voyles (August 11, 1898 – January 11, 1982) was an American gridiron football coach, college athletics administrator, and sports executive.  He served as the head football coach at Southwestern State Teachers College—now known as Southwestern Oklahoma State University—from 1922 to 1924, at the College of William & Mary from 1939 to 1943, and at Auburn University from 1944 to 1947, compiling a career college football record of 58–40–3.  Voyles was the head of the Brooklyn Dodgers of the All-America Football Conference (AAFC) in 1948 and the Hamilton Tiger-Cats of the Canadian Football League (CFL) from 1950 to 1955.

Coaching career

William & Mary
From 1939 to 1943, Voyles served as the athletic director and head football coach at William and Mary, where he compiled a 29–7–3 record. The William & Mary football team did not play during the 1943 season due to a lack of players. In 1978, he was named to the William & Mary Athletic Hall of Fame along with all the members of his 1942 football team.

Auburn
From 1944 to 1947, Voyles coached at Auburn University (officially the Alabama Polytechnic Institute), where he compiled a 15–22 record.

Brooklyn Dodgers
In 1948, Voyles coached the professional football Brooklyn Dodgers of the All-America Football Conference (AAFC) for Branch Rickey. When the team folded in 1949, he was given a position with the Dodgers baseball team.

Hamilton Tiger-Cats
Voyles was the first head coach and general manager of the Hamilton Tiger-Cats. In his six seasons in Hamilton, he had a 48–27–1 record and won the 1953 Grey Cup.  Voyles retired from football after the 1955 season to work as a sales supervisor for a Florida real estate company owned by Toronto stock broker and former Montreal Alouettes owner, Eric Cradock.

Death
Voyles died on January 11, 1982, in Fort Myers, Florida, after a long period of illness.

Head coaching record

College

References

External links
 

1898 births
1982 deaths
American football ends
American men's basketball players
Auburn Tigers athletic directors
Auburn Tigers football coaches
Brooklyn Dodgers (AAFC) coaches
Duke Blue Devils football coaches
Hamilton Tiger-Cats coaches
Hamilton Tiger-Cats general managers
Illinois Fighting Illini football coaches
Oklahoma State Cowboys basketball players
Oklahoma State Cowboys football players
Southwestern Oklahoma State Bulldogs football coaches
William & Mary Tribe athletic directors
William & Mary Tribe football coaches
People from Pottawatomie County, Oklahoma
Coaches of American football from Oklahoma
Players of American football from Oklahoma
Basketball players from Oklahoma